Bavaripsitta ballmanni is a prehistoric parrot described from a fossil tarsometatarsus found in middle Miocene freshwater deposits in the Nördlinger Ries of western Bavaria in Southern Germany. It is the only species in the genus Bavaripsitta. The generic name derives from "Bavaria", and a diminutive form of the Latin for "parrot".  The specific epithet honours Peter Ballmann, who first recognised the described material as coming from a parrot, for his work on the fossil birds of Nördlinger Ries.

References

Extinct monotypic bird genera
Parrots
Neogene birds of Europe
Psittacidae
Fossil taxa described in 2004
Miocene birds